The Battle of Galveston was a naval and land battle of the American Civil War, when Confederate forces under Major Gen. John B. Magruder expelled occupying Union troops from the city of Galveston, Texas on January 1, 1863.

After the loss of the cutter , the Union Fleet Commander William B. Renshaw blew up the stranded vessel  to save it from falling into enemy hands. Union troops on shore thought the fleet was surrendering, and laid down their arms.
The battle is sometimes called the Second Battle of Galveston, as the Battle of Galveston Harbor (October 1862) is sometimes called the First Battle of Galveston.

Battle
Outnumbered six to two by the Northern ships, Neptune was severely damaged by the Union Fleet and eventually sank. While Neptune was quickly disabled, Bayou City succeeded in capturing .

During this time,  was grounded on a sandbar.  A, but Union Fleet Commander William B. Renshaw, ignoring the negotiation offer, attempted to destroy the grounded Westfield with explosives rather than let it fall into enemy hands.

Reanshaw and several Union troops were subsequently killed when the explosives were set off too early. Union troops on shore were convinced that their own ships were surrendering and, therefore, laid down there arms. The remaining U.S. ships did not surrender and succeeded in retreating to Union-controlled New Orleans.

Aftermath
The Union blockade around the city of Galveston was lifted temporarily for four days, and Galveston remained the only major port that remained in Confederate hands at the end of the war. The Confederate Congress stated this on the successful recapture of Galveston:

The bold, intrepid, and gallant conduct of Maj. Gen. J. Bankhead Magruder, Col. Thomas Green, Maj. Leon Smith and other officers, and of the Texan Rangers and soldiers engaged in the attack on, and victory achieved over, the land and naval forces of the enemy at Galveston, on the 1st of January, 1863, eminently entitle them to the thanks of Congress and the country... This brilliant achievement, resulting, under the providence of God, in the capture of the war steamer Harriet Lane and the defeat and ignominious flight of the hostile fleet from the harbor, the recapture of the city and the raising of the blockade of the port of Galveston, signally evinces that superior force may be overcome by skillful conception and daring courage.

See also
 Jonathan Mayhew Wainwright II, killed in action during the battle.

References

External links
 National Park Service battle description
 CWSAC Report Update
 The Battle of Galveston (1 January 1863) at Lone Star Junction
 Battle of Galveston at The Handbook of Texas Online

Battle of Galveston
Battles of the Trans-Mississippi Theater of the American Civil War
Confederate victories of the American Civil War
Conflicts in 1863
Battle of Galveston
Battle of Galveston
Battles of the American Civil War in Texas
January 1863 events
Naval battles of the American Civil War